Netzer Hazani is a community settlement in central Israel. It falls under the jurisdiction of Nahal Sorek Regional Council.

History
The village was established in 2010 near Yesodot by former settlers who had been expelled from the Gaza Strip as a result of the disengagement plan, and was named after the former settlement of the same name. It was officially recognized in 2013.

References

Community settlements
2010 establishments in Israel
Populated places established in 2010
Populated places in Central District (Israel)